Samuel Donnelly (born 1 January 1874) was a Scottish professional footballer.

Professionally he was an inside right player and played in the Football League for Notts County and Blackpool.

Career
Annbank-born Donnelly began his career with his hometown club Annbank. In July 1893 he joined Notts County, and went on to make 32 League appearances for the Magpies, scoring seven goals. In 1896 he joined Blackpool, for whom he made fourteen League appearances and scored five goals, in their inaugural season in the Football League.

References

External links
Ayr United enquiries and stats - Facebook, 24 May 2019

1874 births
Year of death missing
Footballers from South Ayrshire
Scottish footballers
Annbank F.C. players
Notts County F.C. players
Blackpool F.C. players
Association football inside forwards
FA Cup Final players